Kaski District, a part of Gandaki Province, is one of the seventy-seven districts of Nepal. The name is disambiguated from Kaskikot, the ancient Kaski Kingdom.

The district, with Pokhara as its district headquarter, covers an area of 2,017 square km and had a total population of 492,098 according to 2011 Census. This district lies at the centroid point of the country. The altitude of Kaski district ranges from 450 meters the lowest land to 8091 meters the highest point in the Himalaya range. Kaski District politically has One Metropolitan City, 4 Gaupalika and 3 electoral sectors.

The district covers parts of the Annapurna mountain range, and the picturesque scene of the mountains can be observed from most parts of the district. It is one of the best tourist destinations of Nepal. The district is full of rivers such as Seti Gandaki, Modi and Madi along with other rivulets. The district headquarters Pokhara lies about 750 m above the sea level. The district is known for the Himalayan range with about 11 Himalayas with height greater than 7000 m. The nearby peaks include Machhapuchhre (Virgin Peak - 6993m). The Annapurna Range in the northern side is always full of snow. The scenery of northern mountains, gorge of Seti River, Davis Falls, natural caves, Fewa Lake, Begnas Lake and Rupa Lake are both natural resources and tourist attractions.

Etymology
Regarding Booring the origin of the name Kaski, there are many hypotheses; among them:

 from Khās; Cas; Kas: Caus, referring to the Khās Rulers. 
 from Kashyap Rishi who spent his time in Kaskikot making ayurvedic grantha "Kashyap Sagita";
 
 from koshkash, meaning a place with natural mineral resources;
 from kacchad, a Nepali style of dress;
 from Kashikot, the central part of Kaski.

History

It is believed that human settlement in Kaski was there from Pre-historic period. Many historian refer Kaski; word to be from Kāshyāp Rishi. The civilisation inside the valley started with Khās Rulers.

In the early 1800s, the capital of Kaski was Batulechaur and that Sarangkot was a town with a fort.

Politics

All the governance and development of Kaski District are handled mainly by District Development Committee Kaski (DDC-Kaski).

Culture

The district is full of people with multi-language, multi-religion and multiple cultures. Different people have different foods, dresses and norms based on their caste and religion. Many places offer Home Stay for internal as well as international tourists along with performance of local dance according to caste and cultures.
According to the census of 2068 Kaski district has people of about 84 castes, 44 languages and 11 religions. The dressing style of people here matches with national dress. The main foods of people here are Dal-Bhat Tarkari, Roti, and Dhindo (These are typical Nepalese foods). The district is the common place of different castes such as Gurung, Brahmin, Chhetri, Newar, Thakali, kumal and many more. So,Nepal is multi-language,multi-reli
gion

Sports

According to the District Sport Committee, Kaski District have one stadium, named Pokhara Rangashala, of about 417 Ropani of area and capacity of 21,000 spectators. Kaski has its reputation in generating sportsmen in the country.

Tourism

Boating is possible in Phewa Lake and takes in the surrounding forest and settlements near it. The Tal Barahi temple is also situated at the middle of the lake.
Begnas Lake, at Lekhnath of Kaski district, is the third big lake of Nepal with the area of 3.73 square km. The lake is known for its pure water compared with other lakes and the view of Annapurna and Machhapuchhre.
 Rupa Lake
Patale Chhango or Davis Falls: water falls located at Chorepatan-Pokhara.
Gupteshwor Mahadev Cave at Chorepatan-Pokhara is a religious and tourism destination.
Mahendra Cave at Bataulechaur has length of about 125 m. It has different images of Lord Shiva and Lord Ganesh and others that are natural.
Planeterium at Bataulechaur is a tourist location with different attractions, such as a planetarium, science center, mirror maze, and mystery house.
Seti River flows from Machhapuchhre Peak through gorges with the depth of about 200 feet.
Bindhabasini Temple is one of the most important religious destination of Nepal. Different Himalayas can be seen from this temple.
Sarangkot is known for views of the sunrise, sunset, views of Pokhara city and Paragliding. It is located at about 5500 feet.
Machhapuchhre is a mountain 6997m in height, known for its fish-tail structure. The peak is still not open for mountaineers.
The Annapurna Range, on the border between Manang and Myagdi Districts, is seen from almost all places of Kaski district.
Panchase Chhetra is an area of about 5500 hectares including five peaks (Panchadham) and the sources of the rivers Harpan, Rati, Jare, Aandhi, Seti. This region lies in the border of Kaski, Parbat and Syangja district.  Many Himalayas can be seen from this place. This is the place with many Sunakhari;  you can find about 113 different types of Sungava. The region is known for its biodiversity, featuring Lali Gurans, Kharshu, Chap, Chandan and many more of about 600 types and also the place for different animals such as tiger, bear, deer.
Bat Cave (Chameri Gufa in Nepali language) is a solutional cave, which has a habitat of Horseshoe bats over the walls and ceiling. Formed of limestone, it is a show cave and one of the most visited tourist destinations in Pokhara. The cave has one entrance and one exit. The exit is narrower than the entrance and needs climbing. The indigenous belief is that only those who have not sinned should pass the exit hole. The cave is surrounded by forest. It is close to the nearby Mahendra Cave. The cave is U-shaped and inside the cave are carvings of Hindu deities.
Dhampus village: Dhampus is a village and Village Development Committee in Kaski District in the Gandaki Province of northern-central Nepal. At the time of the 1991 Nepal census, it had a population of 2,753 persons living in 547 individual households. It is gradually turning into a tourist destination. It has the Australian Base Camp with views of the peaks Annapurna, Dhaulagiri and Machhapuchhre.
Astam Village is a village of Dhital, one of the wards of Machhapuchhre Rural Municipality of Kaski. It provides a panoramic view of Annapurna and Machhapuchhre range. The range of Mardi Trek starts from Astam village and climbs towards Dhital, Hyangjakot, Dhampus, Forest-Camp, Rest Camp, Low Camp, Badal Danda, High Camp, Viewpoint and BaseCamp.

Geography and climate

Demographics
At the time of the 2011 Nepal census, Kaski District had a population of 492,098.

As their first language, 78.5% spoke Nepali, 12.0% Gurung, 2.2% Magar, 2.2% Newari, 1.5% Tamang, 0.7% Bhojpuri, 0.5% Hindi, 0.5% Maithili, 0.4% Urdu, 0.2% Kham, 0.2% Rai, 0.2% Thakali, 0.2% Tharu, 0.1% Bengali, 0.1% Bhujel, 0.1% Chantyal and 0.1% other languages.

Ethnicity/caste: 27.9% were Hill Brahmin, 16.7% Gurung, 14.4% Chhetri, 8.6% Magar, 8.0% Kami, 4.9% Newar, 3.7% Damai/Dholi, 2.7% Tamang, 2.5% Sarki, 1.4% Gharti/Bhujel, 1.4% Thakuri, 0.9% Musalman, 0.8% Badi, 0.8% Sanyasi/Dasnami, 0.7% Rai, 0.5% Kumal, 0.5% Thakali, 0.5% Tharu, 0.3% other Dalit, 0.2% Chhantyal, 0.2% Kalwar, 0.2% Sonar, 0.1% Bengali, 0.1% Dura, 0.1% Gaine, 0.1% Hajam/Thakur, 0.1% Halwai, 0.1% Kathabaniyan, 0.1% Koiri/Kushwaha, 0.1% Limbu, 0.1% Majhi, 0.1% Sherpa, 0.1% Teli, 0.1% other Terai, 0.1% Yadav, 0.1% foreigners and 0.1% others.

Religion: 82.3% were Hindu, 13.5% Buddhist, 2.1% Christian, 0.9% Muslim, 0.6% Bon, 0.1% Kirati, 0.1% Prakriti and 0.3% others.

Literacy: 82.0% could both read and write, 1.6% could read but not write and 16.4% could neither read nor write.

Administration
The district consists of one metropolitan city and four rural municipalities. These are as follows:
Pokhara Metropolitan City
Annapurna Rural Municipality
Machhapuchchhre Rural Municipality
Madi Rural Municipality
Rupa Rural Municipality

Former Municipalities and Village Development Committees 

Arba Vijaya
Armala (Nghola) 
Begnas
Bhachok
Bhadaure Tamagi
Bhalam
Bharat Pokhari
Chapakot
Dangsing(T'uhsi)
Deurali
Dhampus (Toh'mle)
Dhikur Pokhari
Dhital
Ghachok (kazo)
Ghandruk (Koh'da)
Hansapur
Hemja
Kahun
Kalika
Kaskikot(Kas-khi ko'i)
Kristinachnechaur
Lahachok (LaZo)
Lamachaur, Pokhara
Lekhnath Municipality
Lumle (Lhu'le)
Lwangghale(Lahwaa-Kahli)
Machhapuchchhre (Kata'shu)
Majhthana
Mala
Mauja(Mhuja)
Mijuredanda
Namarjung(Namju)
Nirmalpokhari
Parche(Paje)
Pokhara Sub-metropolitan Municipality
Pumdibhumdi
Puranchaur
Rakhi
Ribhan(R'hamay)
Rupakot(Rup ko'i)
Saimarang
Salyan
Sarangkot
Sardikhola
Shisuwa
Siddha
Sildujure
Thumakodada (also known as Tarkang)
Thumki

 The Village Development Committee (VDC) was dissolved on 10 March 2017 to be replaced by the Gaunpalika. So,There is no VDCs in this current time.

See also
Provinces of Nepal

References

External links

 

 
Gandaki Province
Districts of Nepal established in 1962